American Samoa is made up of  five main volcanic islands and two coral atolls. American Samoa has a limited supply of drinking water.

Lakes

Crater Lake
Faimuliuai Lake
Lake Fiti
Lake Namo
Pala "Mud" Lake
Pala Lagoon
To Sua Ocean Trench Lake
Lake Olomaga
Red Lake

References

Lakes of American Samoa
American Samoa
lakes
American Samoa